Matthias Schröder, also spelled Schroeder, is a visually impaired Paralympic athlete from Germany competing in T12 (track) and F12 (field) events.

At the 2004 Summer Paralympics, he won a silver medal in the men's 200 metres T12 event, a bronze medal in the men's 200 metres - T12, and also competed in the men's 4 × 100 metre relay T11–T13 and men's long jump F12 events.

He competed in the 2008 Summer Paralympics in Beijing, China. There he won a gold medal in the men's 400 metres T12 event, finished seventh in the men's 100 metres T12 event, finished sixth in the men's 200 metres T12 event and went out in the first round of the men's 4x100 metre relay T11-13 event.

In 2009, Schröder set a new F12 Long Jump world record.

At the 2012 Summer Paralympics, he competed in the men's 200 metres T12 and men's 400 metres T12 events but did not win a medal. In 2012, the men's long jump event was not offered for athletes in his classification.

References

External links 
 

Year of birth missing (living people)
Living people
German male sprinters
German male long jumpers
Paralympic athletes of Germany
Paralympic gold medalists for Germany
Paralympic medalists in athletics (track and field)
Athletes (track and field) at the 2004 Summer Paralympics
Athletes (track and field) at the 2008 Summer Paralympics
Athletes (track and field) at the 2012 Summer Paralympics
Medalists at the 2004 Summer Paralympics
Medalists at the 2008 Summer Paralympics
World record holders in Paralympic athletics